D'Aguilar Peninsula is located in southeastern Hong Kong Island, in the Southern District of Hong Kong. It is named after Major-General Sir George Charles d'Aguilar.

Cape D'Aguilar is located in the southeastern part of D'Aguilar Peninsula. It is worth noting that Hok Tsui actually refers to a different cape to the southwest of the peninsula.

Conservation

See also
 Shek O Country Park

References

Peninsulas of Hong Kong
Southern District, Hong Kong